is a Japanese voice actor and narrator who was born in Kobe, Japan. He is affiliated with Aoni Production. His most notable role is Roronoa Zoro from One Piece. Other major voice roles include Toshiro Hijikata from Gintama, Date Masamune from Sengoku Basara, Xiahou Dun and Dian Wei from Dynasty Warriors and Warriors Orochi series,  Shinjiro Aragaki from the Persona series, Mugen from Samurai Champloo, Mondo Owada from the Danganronpa series, Ultraman Max in Ultraman Max and Jin Sakai in the Japanese dub of the video game Ghost of Tsushima. He won a Best Supporting Actor award at the 5th Seiyu Awards in 2011 for his roles in One Piece and Gin Tama.

Filmography

Anime

Films

Video games

Drama CDs

Tokusatsu

Dubbing

References

Notes

External links
 Official agency profile 
 
 
 
 Kazuya Nakai at Oricon 

1967 births
Living people
Male voice actors from Kobe
Japanese male video game actors
Japanese male voice actors
20th-century Japanese male actors
21st-century Japanese male actors
Aoni Production voice actors